The Indianapolis Subdivision is a railroad line owned and operated by CSX Transportation in the U.S. states of Ohio and Indiana. The line runs from Hamilton, Ohio, (north of Cincinnati) west to Indianapolis, Indiana, along a former Baltimore and Ohio Railroad line.

The east end of the Indianapolis Subdivision is at the end of a branch of the Cincinnati Terminal Subdivision, near the south end of the Toledo Subdivision. Its west end is just east of downtown Indianapolis at the Indianapolis Terminal Subdivision.

History
The line was built by the Junction Railroad, opened from 1859 to 1869. Through takeovers, leases, and mergers, it became part of the Baltimore and Ohio Railroad and later CSX.

References

CSX Transportation lines
Rail infrastructure in Ohio
Rail infrastructure in Indiana
Baltimore and Ohio Railroad lines
1859 establishments in Indiana
1859 establishments in Ohio